Psilophyllites is an extinct genus of cephalopod belonging to the ammonite subclass.

References

Jurassic ammonites
Ammonites of Europe
Psiloceratidae
Ammonitida genera